Ocheyedan may refer to a place in the United States:

Ocheyedan, Iowa
Ocheyedan River, in Minnesota and Iowa